Busted Life is a 2014 drama about two African immigrants, Femi and Uzor, whose friendship is tested while living in the United States. The film is based on a true story by the producer Austin Chima and depicts a tale of a drug cartel. The film's principal photography began in early 2010 but as of 2014 has completed post production. Black Magic Tim served as cinematographer and has been involved with the success of several other Nollywood USA films. The film is making its festival and limited theatrical releases across the globe.

Cast
 Ramsey Nouah as Uzor
 Chet Anekwe as Femi
 Sarah Fasha as Sheryl 
 Ron Bush as Chief Scott
 Pascal Atuma as The Clerk

Nominations 
 2014 NAFCAwards: Best Drama Diaspora Film

Awards 
 2014 NAFCAwards: Best Drama Diaspora Film

References

External links
 
 

Nigerian independent films
English-language Nigerian films
2014 films
Films set in the United States
2010s English-language films